The 2020 All-Ireland Senior Hurling Championship Final, the 133rd event of its kind and the culmination of the 2020 All-Ireland Senior Hurling Championship, was played at Croke Park in Dublin on 13 December 2020.

The match was televised live on RTÉ2 as part of The Sunday Game, presented by Joanne Cantwell from the outside studio at Croke Park, with analysis by Anthony Daly, Donal Óg Cusack and Henry Shefflin. Commentary on the game was provided by Marty Morrissey alongside Michael Duignan. The match was also live on Sky Sports, with analysis from Jamesie O'Connor and Ollie Canning.

Limerick won the game by 0-30 to 0-19 to claim their second All-Ireland title in three years.

Background
The championship was delayed due to the impact of the COVID-19 pandemic on Gaelic games. This was the latest the final had taken place in a year since 1924, when the All-Ireland hurling final took place on 14 December.
Waterford had not won the All-Ireland since 1959 (61 years) and had only appeared in three finals in the interim (1963, 2008 and 2017).
This was the third final in the previous four years not to involve one of the Big Three (Cork, Kilkenny, Tipperary) — the 2017 (Galway—Waterford) and 2018 (Limerick—Galway) finals also did not involve them.
This was the third final in which both the teams were from the province of Munster, with the first two being in 1997 (Clare—Tipperary) and 2013 (Clare—Cork).
This was only the third All-Ireland final in history in which neither team scored a goal, the first two being in 1999 and 2004.

Paths to the final

Waterford

Limerick

Pre-match
The 2020 Joe McDonagh Cup Final between Kerry and Antrim took place prior to the All-Ireland senior final.

On 4 December 2020, the officials were chosen for the final by the GAA, with Tipperary's Fergal Horgan being named as the referee in what would be his second senior final after being the referee in 2017. Colm Lyons from Cork was named as standby referee, with the other linesman being Paud O'Dwyer from Carlow and the sideline official Seán Cleere from Kilkenny.

Jubilee team
The Clare team that won the 1995 All-Ireland Final were remembered before the match to mark 25 years. There was no traditional walk out and parade due to COVID-19 restrictions but the Clare captain of 1995 Anthony Daly was present to place the Liam MacCarthy Cup in front of the Hogan Stand before the match.

Match details

Post-match
Financial Times columnist Simon Kuper wrote after Stephen O'Keeffe's performance that hurling was "the best sport ever and if the Irish had colonised the world, nobody would ever have heard of football".

References

Final
All-Ireland Senior Hurling Championship Finals
All-Ireland Senior Hurling Championship Final
All-Ireland Senior Hurling Championship Final, 2020
All-Ireland Championship